Alexander McCarthy (1801 – 1868) was an Irish Liberal, Independent Irish Party and Repeal Association politician.

McCarthy was first elected Repeal Association Member of Parliament (MP) for Cork City at a by-election in 1846 caused by the resignation of Francis Murphy. He  held the seat until 1847 when he was defeated at that year's election. In 1856, he became High Sheriff of County Cork before returning to parliament for the county as an Independent Irish Party MP at the 1857 general election and held the seat until 1859; at that year's general election, he unsuccessfully fought Dublin City as a Liberal.

References

External links
 

UK MPs 1841–1847
UK MPs 1857–1859
Irish Repeal Association MPs
Irish Nationalist politicians
1801 births
1868 deaths
High Sheriffs of County Cork
Members of the Parliament of the United Kingdom for Cork City
Members of the Parliament of the United Kingdom for County Cork constituencies (1801–1922)